Al-Dubiyah, pronounced as ad-Dubiyah, is a subject of Baladiyah al-Batha and one of the oldest neighborhoods of Riyadh, Saudi Arabia, located between Mikal and as-Salam. The area is known for its traditional mud-brick houses and derelict earth structured buildings.

References 

Neighbourhoods in Riyadh